Spencer Foo (born May 19, 1994), also known as Fu Jiang, is a Chinese Canadian professional ice hockey forward currently playing for the Henderson Silver Knights in the American Hockey League (AHL) while under contract to the Vegas Golden Knights of the National Hockey League (NHL). Foo turned professional in 2017 by signing an entry-level contract with the Calgary Flames of the National Hockey League (NHL) as an undrafted college free agent. Foo has also played for the Kunlun Red Star of the Kontinental Hockey League (KHL).

Playing career
A native of Edmonton, Foo began his junior hockey career in the Alberta Junior Hockey League (AJHL), playing key offensive minutes and producing impressive offensive numbers in two seasons with the Bonnyville Pontiacs from 2012 to 2014. In his second season with the team, Foo scored 40 goals in 60 games, easily leading the team in scoring.

Too old to continue in the AJHL and having attracted little NHL interest, Foo moved to the Union Dutchmen of the NCAA's ECAC Hockey conference for the 2014–15 season. Foo posted pedestrian numbers in his first two seasons with the Dutchmen, scoring 25 points each year. However, the management of the Calgary Flames was impressed enough by Foo's 2015–16 campaign to invite him to their 2016 Fall Development Camp. He was not offered a contract.

Foo broke out for the Dutchmen in the 2016–17 season, scoring 62 points in 38 games, leading in assists with 36 and finishing second in goals and points behind Mike Vecchione, numbers that attracted the interest of the Philadelphia Flyers, Detroit Red Wings, Vegas Golden Knights, and his hometown Edmonton Oilers. However, Foo ultimately committed to the Calgary Flames and signed a two-year entry-level deal on 1 July.

Foo was assigned by the Flames to the American Hockey League's Stockton Heat on 26 September 2017 as part of a round of cuts during training camp. Foo started slowly with the Heat, recording just 6 goals and 13 points in his first 30 games, but he then added another 6 goals and 5 assists in his next 9 games, becoming the AHL's Player of the Week for the week ending 28 January 2018. Foo played his first NHL game with the Calgary Flames against his hometown team, the Edmonton Oilers, in Calgary on March 31, 2018. He recorded his first career NHL goal on April 5, 2018, in a 2–1 loss to the Winnipeg Jets.

On June 25, 2019, having completed his entry-level contract, Foo was tendered a qualifying offer with the Flames. The following day, it was announced that the Chinese-Canadian had signed a two-year contract with Kunlun Red Star of the KHL.

On July 14, 2022, Foo returned to North America after three seasons in the KHL, signing a one-year, two-way contract with the Vegas Golden Knights for the  season.

International play
Foo was formally called up to represent the China men's national ice hockey team for the 2022 Winter Olympics on January 28, 2022.

Career statistics

Regular season and playoffs

International

Awards and honours

References

External links

1994 births
Living people
Canadian emigrants to China
Naturalized citizens of the People's Republic of China
Bonnyville Pontiacs players
Calgary Flames players
Canadian ice hockey right wingers
Canadian people of Chinese descent
Henderson Silver Knights players
HC Kunlun Red Star players
Ice hockey people from Edmonton
Stockton Heat players
Undrafted National Hockey League players
Union Dutchmen ice hockey players
AHCA Division I men's ice hockey All-Americans
Ice hockey players at the 2022 Winter Olympics
Olympic ice hockey players of China